Sara Ronzero Sánchez (born 5 December 2001) is a Spanish footballer who plays as a midfielder for Madrid CFF.

Club career
Ronzero started her career at Madrid CFF.

References

External links
Profile at La Liga

2001 births
Living people
Women's association football midfielders
Spanish women's footballers
Footballers from Madrid
Atlético Madrid Femenino players
Madrid CFF players
Primera División (women) players
Segunda Federación (women) players